Kevin Vandenbergh (born 16 May 1983) is a Belgian former professional footballer who plays as a forward for Ramsel in the Belgian Provincial Leagues. His father, Erwin Vandenbergh, was one of the most prolific strikers in the 1980s for Belgium.

He also earned some caps with Belgium and the Belgian U21 team, with his debut in the national side in 2004. Vandenbergh scored a hat-trick in Belgium's 3–2 win against Ukraine in the round of 16 of 2006 U21 European Football Championship.

Career
Vandenbergh was born in Bonheiden. He played for K.V.C. Westerlo until 2002, then he went to K.R.C. Genk. He proved to be an exceptional goal-scorer like his father Erwin Vandenbergh, 66 goals in overall 138 appearances in the four seasons he was in Fenix Stadion. After a successful 2006–07 season for his club where Genk came in second place, he joined Dutch Eredivisie side Utrecht. This was due to a falling-out with his manager Hugo Broos. Vandenbergh could not fit in with Broos' plans, eventually his place in the starting XI replaced by Goran Ljubojevic.

Career statistics
Scores and results list Belgium's goal tally first, score column indicates score after each Vandenbergh goal.

References

External links
Profile 

Living people
1983 births
People from Bonheiden
Belgian footballers
Association football forwards
Belgium international footballers
K.V.C. Westerlo players
K.R.C. Genk players
K.A.S. Eupen players
Beerschot A.C. players
FC Utrecht players
K.V. Mechelen players
K.F.C. Dessel Sport players
Belgian Pro League players
Challenger Pro League players
Eredivisie players
Belgian expatriate footballers
Belgian expatriate sportspeople in the Netherlands
Expatriate footballers in the Netherlands
Footballers from Antwerp Province